Ole Mørk (born 28 May 1948), sometimes known as Ole Mørch, is a Danish football manager and former player, who was most recently youth coach at HB Køge. He has worked for several TV stations as a commentator and recently as a football columnist from January until June 2007 with Danish newspaper Politiken. From 2007 until 2010 he was self-employed as a personal coach.

External links
Danish national team profile
 Boldklubben Frem profile
 Homepage
 Ole Mørk's Politiken column

1948 births
Living people
Danish men's footballers
Danish football managers
Boldklubben Frem players
Boldklubben Frem managers
Herfølge Boldklub managers
Akademisk Boldklub managers
Trelleborgs FF managers
Boldklubben af 1893 managers
Association football forwards
Footballers from Copenhagen